Niamh Kilkenny is a camogie player, a member of the Galway senior panel that won the All Ireland Senior Camogie Championship in 2013 & 2019  and unsuccessfully contested the All Ireland finals of 2010 and 2011 against Wexford, winner of  All Star awards in 2010 and 2011 and a member of the Team of the Championship for 2011.

Other awards
Niamh attended Holy Rosary, Mountbellew, doing her Leaving cert in 2007 and going on to study in NUI Galway. She won senior Gael Linn Cup 2008, All Ireland Minor 2004, Connacht schools title.

References

1989 births
Living people
Galway camogie players
Sportspeople from Galway (city)